The initialism NVDA may refer to:

 Non-violent direct action
 NonVisual Desktop Access, an open source screen reader software for Windows
 Narmada Valley Development Authority, a government organization in Madhya Pradesh, India
 Nvidia NASDAQ ticker symbol
 National Volunteer Defence Army, a rebel group in Tibet
 Network for Voluntary Development in Asia, network of international volunteering organisations in Asia